The Ministry of Justice, Legal and Parliamentary Affairs is a government ministry, responsible for courts in Zimbabwe. The incumbent minister is Ziyambi Ziyambi and the deputy minister is Jessie Majome. Virginia Mabiza was the permanent secretary.

List of Ministers 
Eddison Zvobgo (18 April 1982 – 18 April 1985)
Emmerson Mnangagwa (1989 – July 2000)
 Patrick Chinamasa (July 2000 – 11 September 2013)
 Emmerson Mnangagwa (11 September 2013 – 9 October 2017)
 Happyton Bonyongwe (9 October 2017 – 2 November 2017)
 Ziyambi Ziyambi (since 2 November 2017)

References

Government of Zimbabwe
Law enforcement in Zimbabwe
Zimbabwe
Parliamentary affairs ministries